Welcome Home Armageddon is the fifth studio album by Welsh post-hardcore band Funeral for a Friend released on 14 March 2011 in the UK and 15 March 2011 in the US. It was also the last full length Funeral for a Friend album released featuring drummer/screamer Ryan Richards, who had been in the band since the Four Ways to Scream Your Name EP.

Two songs on the album – "Sixteen" and "Damned If You Do, Dead If You Don't" – had previously appeared in the band's 2010 EP The Young & Defenceless.
 
On 10 January 2011, the band released the music video for the first single off the album, "Front Row Seats to the End of the World". The single was officially released on 24 January 2011. Furthermore, on 9 February 2011, Funeral For A Friend released a music video shot for the album's  second single "Sixteen". A music video for the third single, "Broken Foundation" was released in the summer of 2011.

Background
Explaining the album's title, vocalist Matt Davies-Kreye told Complete Music Update: "A friend of mine was mentioning how he felt that the best thing for the planet was for the human race to just drop dead and at times I can see and understand his way of thinking but a big part of me has this (probably) misguided faith in humanity to kind of steer the ship in the right direction for a change. So Welcome Home Armageddon is the idea of patiently waiting for the end to arrive at your doorstep and give you a nice big hug."

Track listing

Bonus tracks

Critical reception

Welcome Home Armageddon received generally positive reviews from music critics. At Metacritic, which assigns a normalized rating out of 100 to reviews from mainstream critics, the album received an average score of 77, based on 10 reviews, which indicates "generally favorable reviews".

Rocksound"Welcome Home Armageddon is an extremely satisfying album, for fans old and new. Ferocious and beautiful - Funeral for a Friend sound more like themselves than they have done in years."

MusicOMH (3/5)
"Armageddon is a sop to the disaffected fans of FFAF's pomp, and in seeking to recapture their ardour it tries too hard to pander to their needs. And from the few tracks that evidence what could have been, that's a shame."

Bring The Noise (8/10)
"...although there are heavy elements on this, the Welsh favourites' fifth album, the real theme running throughout the record is that of a pop-punk masterpiece."

SputnikMusic (4/5)
"Simply put, this is Funeral for a Friend's best album."

Absolutepunk.net (87%)
"Top to bottom this album feels like a classic; a show stopper. No thrills, no cheap tricks and gimmicks. Where so many bands attempt to go back to their roots and fall short, Funeral for a Friend find themselves back in a comfort zone and pushing themselves to even better heights."

Allmusic.com (3.5/5)
"Welcome Home Armageddon has something that's missing from all the cookie-cutter screamo albums that have flooded the market in the 21st century: an honest to God sense of pop/rock craftsmanship."

Recording personnel

Funeral For a Friend
 Matthew Davies-Kreye – lead vocals
 Kris Coombs-Roberts – guitar, backing vocals
 Gavin Burrough – guitar, backing vocals
 Ryan Richards – drums, unclean vocals
 Richard Boucher – bass guitar

Additional personnel
 Romesh Dodangoda – production, mixing
 Shawn Joseph – mastering
 Rob Thomas – assistant engineer
 Rianne Rowlands - Album Artwork - Illustrations
 Ryan Waring – Logo Design
 Jamie Telford, Danny Bugler & Rhodri Jones Gang vocals on "Damned If You Do, Dead If You Don't"

Release history

Chart performance

References

2011 albums
Funeral for a Friend albums
Albums produced by Romesh Dodangoda